Gordon Cameron (25 February 1922 – 29 December 1995) was an Australian rules footballer who played with Carlton in the Victorian Football League (VFL).

Notes

External links 

Gordon Cameron's profile at Blueseum

1922 births
1995 deaths
Carlton Football Club players
Australian rules footballers from Victoria (Australia)